Andrew McCowie (6 January 187615 November 1957) was a Scottish footballer who played as an inside forward in the English Football League for Liverpool, Woolwich Arsenal, Middlesbrough and Chesterfield Town.

Career
McCowie was born in Old Monkland, Lanarkshire, in 1876. He played amateur (Junior) football for local  Cambuslang Hibernian, from where he signed for Football League First Division club Liverpool in 1896. He became a fixture in the Liverpool side, playing 19 matches in the 1897–98 Football League season. The following season, he scored five goals in 12 matches as Liverpool finished runners-up to Aston Villa.

In 1899, McCowie dropped down to the Second Division to join Woolwich Arsenal. Playing mainly at inside left, McCowie scored seven goals in 28 league appearances, and also played five matches in the FA Cup. He moved to Middlesbrough early in the 1900–01 season, and spent the following season with another Second Division club, Chesterfield Town. McCowie badly injured a knee during a match against Newton Heath in March 1902, and never played league football again.

McCowie died in Cambuslang, Lanarkshire, on 15 November 1957, at the age of 81.

References

1876 births
1957 deaths
Sportspeople from Cambuslang
Scottish footballers
Association football inside forwards
Cambuslang Hibernian F.C. players
Scottish Junior Football Association players
Arsenal F.C. players
Liverpool F.C. players
Middlesbrough F.C. players
Chesterfield F.C. players
English Football League players
Footballers from South Lanarkshire